The meaning of "Praveen" in the Sanskrit language is "skilled" or "talented." It is most often a male name and a given name, and less commonly a surname. A prevalent modern name, it has been adapted into many other languages. In various languages of South Asia, "praveen" is a word which refers to specialty. For example, in the Telugu language, saṅgeetam-lō pravīṇuḍu (సంగీతంలో ప్రవీణుడు) refers to a person who is skilled in music.

The name "Praveen" was first used by royal heirs of the Ancient South-Indian Kingdoms who were born during the "Rudhrodhgaari" (57th year) of the 60-year cycle of the Tamil Calendar derived from ancient astronomical data, known as the "Tirukkanda Panchanga". (cf. The Secret Doctrine, 2:49-51)

Notable people
 Praveen Chaudhari, Indian American physicist, former director of Brookhaven National Laboratory
 Praveen Thipsay, Indian chess grandmaster
 Praveen Swami, Indian security analyst, journalist and author. Former Diplomatic Editor The Daily Telegraph newspaper
 Yogesh Praveen, Indian author and expert on the history and culture of Avadh
 Praveen Kumar, Indian cricketer
 Pravin Amre, Indian cricketer
 Parveen Kumar Bala, the mayor of Ba, Fiji
 Praveen Togadia, General Secretary of the Vishva Hindu Parishad
 Praveen Chandra, leading Indian cardiologist
 Praveen Jordan, Indonesian Badminton Player
 Praveen (actor), Telugu film actor

See also
Pravin

References